Central Market, also known as Lancaster Central Market, is a historic public market located in Penn Square, in downtown Lancaster, Pennsylvania.  Until 2005, the market was the oldest municipally-operated market in the United States.

The Central Market comprises approximately 60 vendors who principally sell foodstuffs – fresh fruits and produce, meats, cheeses, fish and seafood and baked goods – and flowers. Products for sale come from Amish, Pennsylvania Dutch, German, Greek, Caribbean, Middle Eastern, and Slavic origins.

History
A public marketplace was deeded on this site in 1730 as part of the settlement of Lancaster. The marketplace was officially chartered by King George II on May 1, 1742, officially designating Lancaster as a market town.  The Central Market occupies a portion of the original marketplace, with the first permanent building erected in 1757.

This 20,540 square-foot brick building sits adjacent to the old City Hall, Lancaster's very first skyscraper as well as many other historical buildings.

The current building was built in 1889, and is a brick building with a hipped and gabled terra cotta roof, in the Romanesque Revival style.  Central Market was designed by English architect James H. Warner, who eventually made Lancaster his home.  Its front facade features twin towers measuring   feet tall, with a gable between them.  The interior structure has wooden pillars supporting the roof with a grid of steel rod Howe trusses.

The Central Market was listed on the National Register of Historic Places in 1972. The Central Market is owned and maintained by the City of Lancaster and has been since its development. In more recent years the Central Market Trust, which is a non-profit 501 (c)3 organization has managed it. The trust was formed in 2005 and consists of the Market Manager and eleven volunteers from the community.

Offerings

Each week approximately 3,000 people visit the market, with 82 percent of these people living and/or working in Lancaster and an additional 33 percent of them living within the same zip code as the Central Market.

Vendors offer a wide variety of international and Amish cuisine foods. Vendors include Kauffman's Fruit Farm from Bird-in-Hand, Pennsylvania, Hodecker's bleached celery, cookies, Springerle House ornaments, hardwood smoked hams and bacon from S. Clyde Weaver, and sweets from Pennsylvania Fudge Company. For more than 100 years, the Stoner Family Vegetable stand has been selling their produce at the market, longer than any other vendor. Thomas Produce has been at the market for 80 years and over 60 years ago, Long's Horseradish stand joined the Central Market family.

Vendors 
Directory of Lancaster Central Market Vendors

 Amish Family Recipes
 Barr's Farm Produce
 Brogue Hydroponics
 Buona Tavola
 Carr's at Central Market
 Central Market Flowers by Perfect Pots
 Central Market Juice Company
 Criollo
 Country Meadows Farms
 Deli Grassi
 Dōzo
 Farm 2 Table Creations
 Flower Garden Crafts
 Fox & Wolfe Farm
 The Goodie Shoppe
 Green Circle Organics
 Groff's Vegetables
 Guacamole Specialists
 Havana Juice
 Horseshoe Ranch
 Inspirational Blossoms
 JB Kelly Seafood Connection
 Kauffman's Fruit Farm
 Kom Essa
 Lancaster County Coffee Roasters
 Lancaster Pet Bakery 
 Lancaster Salad Company
 Linden Dale Farm
 Long's Horseradish
 Maplehofe Dairy
 Mean Cup
 Meck's Produce
 Miesse Candies
 Mr. Bill's Fresh Seafood
New York Pickles
Oak View Acres
Oola Bowls
PA Dutch Gifts
Pineapple House Creations
Pretzels on Market
Pure Palate Organic
Rafiki's Deli
Ric's Bread
rijuice
Rooster Street Butcher
S. Clyde Weaver
Saife's Middle Eastern Food

Renovations
After more than 40 years since its last major upgrade, the Central Market finally received a $7 million renovation. By 2011, the entire project was officially completed. The renovation eliminated large suspended lights, uncovered many pre-existing long windows, and re positioned the mechanical system underground.

Awards and recognitions
The 2011 preservation plan (Lancaster Central Market: Assessments, Guidelines, and Recommendations for Preservation and Development) that guided the building renovation was nationally recognized, winning the American Planning Association's 2013 National Planning Excellence Award for Urban Design. The preservation plan was also awarded the Lancaster County Planning Commission's 2012 Leadership Achievement Award for Historic Resources. The building renovation won the Preservation Pennsylvania 2011 Award.

National Geographic recently named Central Market as one of their travel favorites. The Central Market was also named one of America's 10 greatest public places by the American Planning Association (APA), and was listed as one of the ten best fresh markets in the world (10 of the world’s best fresh markets) by CNN in 2013.

References

External links

"Country’s Oldest Farmers’ Market"

Commercial buildings on the National Register of Historic Places in Pennsylvania
Romanesque Revival architecture in Pennsylvania
Lancaster
Buildings and structures in Lancaster, Pennsylvania
Tourist attractions in Lancaster, Pennsylvania
Commercial buildings completed in 1889
National Register of Historic Places in Lancaster, Pennsylvania